Novoye Annino is a rural locality (a village) in Petushinskoye Rural Settlement, Petushinsky District, Vladimir Oblast, Russia. The population was 601 as of 2010. There are 18 streets.

Geography 
Novoye Annino is located 11 km west of Petushki (the district's administrative centre) by road. Leonovo is the nearest rural locality.

References 

Rural localities in Petushinsky District